Molander is a surname of Scandinavian origin. Notable people with the surname include:
 Gustaf Molander (1888–1973), Swedish actor and film director
 Harald Molander (1909–1994), Swedish film producer
 Helga Molander (1896–1986), German theatre and film actress
 Jan Molander (1920–2009), Swedish actor and film / TV director
 Karin Molander (1889–1978), Swedish stage and film actress
 Nils Molander (1889–1974), Swedish ice hockey player and Olympic competitor
 Olof Molander (1892–1966), Swedish theatre and film director
 Roger Molander (1940–2012), American government official and activist
 Scooter Molander (born 1966), American football player
 Lloyd Bryan Molander Adams (born 1961), American producer and director

See also 
 
 Der Fall Molander, a 1945 German dramatic film directed by Georg Wilhelm Pabst

References 

Swedish-language surnames